Ernst Wister (11 June 1922 – 4 July 1990) was an Austrian gymnast. He competed at the 1948 Summer Olympics and the 1952 Summer Olympics.

Wister died in Graz on 4 July 1990, at the age of 68.

References

External links
 

1922 births
1990 deaths
20th-century Austrian people
Austrian male artistic gymnasts
Olympic gymnasts of Austria
Gymnasts at the 1948 Summer Olympics
Gymnasts at the 1952 Summer Olympics